Musnad al-Siraj, is one of the Hadith books compiled by Imam Muhammad bin Ishaq As Siraj Al Nishapori  (Died 313 AH).

Description
The book contains almost seven thousand hadiths according to Maktaba Shamila. The Musnad (مسند) are collections of Hadiths which are classified by narrators, and therefore by Sahabas (companions of the Islamic prophet Muhammad). This is the book famous mostly among scholars.

Publications
The book has been published by many organizations around the world: 
   Musnad Al-Siraj: Published: Millat Publication, Pakistan

See also
 List of Sunni books
 Kutub al-Sittah
 Sahih Muslim
 Jami al-Tirmidhi
 Sunan Abu Dawood
 Jami' at-Tirmidhi
 Either: Sunan ibn Majah, Muwatta Malik

References

9th-century Arabic books
10th-century Arabic books
Sunni literature
Hadith
Hadith collections
Sunni hadith collections